Joseph Luther Smith, commonly known as Joe L. Smith (May 22, 1880 – August 23, 1962), was an American politician, and a member of the Democratic Party from West Virginia.

He was born in Marshes (now Glen Daniel, West Virginia) in Raleigh County, West Virginia, where he attended public and private schools. Smith was editor and owner of Raleigh Register in Beckley, West Virginia. In addition, he was engaged in the real estate and banking businesses. His political career began in 1904, when, at age of 24, he became mayor of Beckley, a post he held for 25 years until 1929. He also served in the State Senate (1909–1913). Smith was elected to the United States House of Representatives from West Virginia's 6th District in 1928, where he served eight two-year terms (March 4, 1929 – January 3, 1945). He rose to become chairman of the House Committee on Mines and Mining (Seventy-second through Seventy-eighth Congresses). He didn't seek a ninth term in 1944. Fellow Democrat E. H. Hedrick replaced him. After leaving politics, Smith resumed his banking career and resided in Beckley, where he died. He is interred in Sunset Memorial Park.

His son Hulett C. Smith served as Governor of West Virginia.

External links

1880 births
1962 deaths
Democratic Party West Virginia state senators
Mayors of places in West Virginia
Politicians from Beckley, West Virginia
Editors of West Virginia newspapers
Businesspeople from Beckley, West Virginia
Democratic Party members of the United States House of Representatives from West Virginia
20th-century American politicians
20th-century American businesspeople